Two in Love is a 1965 Soviet short drama film directed by Mikhail Bogin.

Plot 
The film tells about a music student named Sergey, who during his walk home sees a beautiful girl, Natasha, who catches his attention. He tries to talk to her but finds her unresponsive, he later discovers that she's deaf. In their own way, they try to understand the other's world. For Sergei, his whole world is centered around sound, whereas for Natasha, hearing and sounds are associated with traumatic experiences from childhood.

Cast 
 Victoria Fyodorova as Natasha
 Valentin Smirnitskiy as Sergey
 Lina Braknyte
 Voldemar Akuraters
 V. Akuratets
 Vlada Freymute as Daughter
 Marta Grakhova
 L. Shmit
 T. Vitin
 V. Zakharov

References

External links 
 

1965 films
1960s Russian-language films
Soviet drama films
1965 drama films